Nanyin may refer to:

Empress Yang Zhi, nickname
Nanguan music, a style of traditional Chinese music originally from Fujian
Naamyam, a style of traditional Cantonese music
Nanyin, Hebei, a town in Yuanshi County, Hebei, China

See also
Nanying (disambiguation)